Robyn Ward is an Irish contemporary artist. He uses mixed media on canvas and combines abstract and realist approaches. He is based in Mexico City.

Early life and education
Ward was born on 3 October 1982 in Dublin, where he lived for five years before moving to Belfast. In 2019, Ward claimed that Campbell College expelled him aged fifteen and that he spent his teenage years skateboarding and painting graffiti on derelict buildings before adopting a nomadic lifestyle. He worked in studios in Bangkok, Shanghai, Amsterdam and Mexico City.

Career
Ward paints on canvas, using a multi-layered style. He uses a mixed media of acrylics, inks, watercolours, Oil paint and spray paint.

Ward cites Jackson Pollock, Banksy, and Hieronymus Bosch as inspiration for his work. His subject matter comprises personal reflections and socio-political commentary. This has included messages about sustainability, racism and bigotry, and the conflict in Ireland.

In 2018, the Art Attack Exhibition at the Royal Monceau Gallery in Paris featured Ward's work. In the same year, Ward displayed his artwork in six other exhibitions and solo shows. His solo exhibition 'Once Upon a Time', held in May 2018 at the House of Fine Art in London, combined images of popular children's cartoon characters with reflections on racism and bigotry. For example, one piece depicted Bugs Bunny with a picket sign reading 'no Blacks, no dogs, and no Irish'.

In 2019, Ward exhibited a series of artworks entitled 'Plastic Nation' that aimed to draw attention to the global environmental crisis. The pieces focused on the impact of the world's consumption of single-use plastics. Ward auctioned some of the artworks from 'Plastic Nation' to raise funds for a non-profit animal welfare charity. Ward's 2021 exhibition 'Fucked at Birth' depicted destruction, violence, and societal breakdown.

References

Living people
People educated at Campbell College
Irish contemporary artists
Year of birth missing (living people)